The Citizens Bank  is a historic site in Williston, Florida, located at 5 North Main Street. On November 29, 1995, it was added to the U.S. National Register of Historic Places.

The Citizens Bank opened in 1914 and closed in 1927, perhaps a victim of the 1926 collapse of the Florida Land Boom.

References

External links
 Florida's Office of Cultural and Historical Programs
 Levy County listings
 Citizen's Bank

Buildings and structures in Levy County, Florida
Bank buildings on the National Register of Historic Places in Florida
Vernacular architecture in Florida
National Register of Historic Places in Levy County, Florida
Williston, Florida